Torre de' Roveri is a comune (municipality) in the Province of Bergamo in the Italian region of Lombardy, located about  northeast of Milan and about  east of Bergamo. 

Torre de' Roveri borders the following municipalities: Albano Sant'Alessandro, Pedrengo, San Paolo d'Argon, Scanzorosciate.

References